Urda (minor planet designation: 167 Urda) is a main-belt asteroid that was discovered by German-American astronomer Christian Heinrich Friedrich Peters on August 28, 1876, in Clinton, New York, and named after Urd, one of the Norns in Norse mythology. In 1905, Austrian astronomer Johann Palisa showed that the asteroid varied in brightness.

Photometric observations of this asteroid at the Palmer Divide Observatory in Colorado Springs, Colorado, during 2007–8 gave a light curve with a period of 13.06133 ± 0.00002 hours. This S-type asteroid is a member of the Koronis family of asteroids that share similar orbital elements.

In 2002, a diameter estimate of 37.93 ± 3.17 km was obtained from the Midcourse Space Experiment observations, with an albedo of 0.2523 ± 0.0448.

A stellar occultation by Urda was observed from Japan on July 23, 2001.

References

External links 
 Lightcurve plot of 167 Urda, Palmer Divide Observatory, B. D. Warner (2007)
 Asteroid Lightcurve Database (LCDB), query form (info )
 Dictionary of Minor Planet Names, Google books
 Asteroids and comets rotation curves, CdR – Observatoire de Genève, Raoul Behrend
 Discovery Circumstances: Numbered Minor Planets (1)-(5000) – Minor Planet Center
 
 

Koronis asteroids
Urda
Urda
S-type asteroids (Tholen)
Sk-type asteroids (SMASS)
18760828
Objects observed by stellar occultation